Willie Miles was an American Negro league baseball outfielder and infielder. He played from 1921 to 1929 with several clubs.

References

External links
 and Baseball-Reference Black Baseball stats and Seamheads

Cleveland Elites players
Cleveland Hornets players
St. Louis Giants (1924) players
Cleveland Browns (baseball) players
Harrisburg Giants players
Pittsburgh Keystones players
Cleveland Tate Stars players
Year of birth unknown
Year of death unknown
Baseball outfielders